Université de Sherbrooke Stadium (Stade de l'Université de Sherbrooke) is a multi-purpose stadium at the Université de Sherbrooke in Sherbrooke, Quebec. It is home to the Sherbrooke Vert et Or track and field, soccer, and football teams. It was built in 2003, and has a fixed seating capacity of 3,359. The stadium hosted the 2003 World Youth Championships in Athletics.

References

Soccer venues in Quebec
Sports venues in Sherbrooke
Athletics (track and field) venues in Quebec
Canadian football venues in Quebec
Multi-purpose stadiums in Quebec
Université de Sherbrooke
Sports venues completed in 2003